Brett Mather (born 3 January 1984) is a New Zealand rugby union player who played as a kicker for the Dallas Cowboys before he was fired by the team after missing 4 out of 5 goals against the Tampa Bay Buccaneers. He now plays provincial rugby for Otago, and is in the Super Rugby team the Highlanders.

Domestic career
Former Otago centre and Highlanders Wider Training Squad member Brett Mather answered an SOS call from the Hurricanes in the early rounds of the 2010 Rebel Sport Super 14 and joined the injury hit squad on their three-match tour of South Africa. Despite his call-up, Mather wasn’t selected in the playing 22 for any of these three games against the Cheetahs, Stormers and Bulls.

Originally from Christchurch, Mather shifted south to Dunedin in 2006 and played 30 matches for Otago prior to moving to the Bay of Plenty Steamers for the 2010 season including a full season at centre in the 2009 Air New Zealand Cup.

He previously spent two years in 2008 and 2009 in the Highlanders and earned eight Super 14 caps for the southern franchise, all in his first season.

Mather transferred to Japan in 2011.

References

External links
Highlanders Profile

New Zealand rugby union players
1984 births
Living people
Otago rugby union players
Bay of Plenty rugby union players
Canterbury rugby union players
Highlanders (rugby union) players
Kurita Water Gush Akishima players
Rugby union players from Christchurch
New Zealand expatriate rugby union players
New Zealand expatriate sportspeople in Japan
Expatriate rugby union players in Japan
Rugby union centres
Rugby union wings